Elsie Allen High School (EAHS) is a high school located in Santa Rosa, California at 599 Bellevue Ave. It is part of the Santa Rosa High School District, which is itself part of Santa Rosa City Schools.  The primary feeder school is Cook Middle School. The school is named after Elsie Allen.

History

Elsie Allen High School was founded in 1994. The first graduating class of the school was in 1997.  It was named after Pomo basket weaver and educator Elsie Allen. The University Center at Elsie Allen High School is the recipient of the prestigious 2010 California School Boards Association Golden Bell Award. The University Center at Elsie Allen High School guarantees admission to Sonoma State University and offers an annual savings of $10,000 in college tuition for students accepted in to the program. In 2009, the University Center boasted the only Presidential Scholar ever to come from a Sonoma County public school; Jesse Nee-Vogelman earned perfect scores in four portions of the SAT. In 2011, parents, faculty and community members came together to support Elsie Allen high School students by creating the Elsie Allen High School Foundation. The non-profit Foundation supports students by providing mentors, job shadows, career days and scholarships to college and trade schools.
In 2017, the Elsie Allen High Foundation received a $250,000 grant to help set up a $1 million endowment fund to provide Elise Allen High student scholarships for decades to come.

Campus
The campus is also home to Midrose High School, an alternative school. Midrose is located on the northside of the campus.

Extracurricular activities

Clubs

Elsie Allen has a number of student clubs, including the California Scholarship Federation, Rotary Interact, Key Club, and a Gay-Straight Alliance.

Journalism and yearbook
The school yearbook is called Phoenix and has been published annually in the spring since 1995. The school newspaper goes by the name The Tracker and has been published continuously since fall 1994. The school graduated its first class in 1997

Sports

Elsie Allen has an American football team. Starting in 2011, they stopped playing in the North Bay League and became an independent team. The school also has a men's club rugby team. Elsie Allen also has boys and girls basketball, boys and girls soccer, and track and field. There is also badminton, swim team and girls tennis.

Performing arts
The Arts Program has twice won the Congressional Art Competition. The Drama Program has received a multitude of awards over the past several years for acting, directing, and overall performance, as well as the top award for playwriting at the annual Lenaea Festival. The Elsie Allen High Drum Line performs regularly for visiting dignitaries at businesses and community events.

Former principals

In 2018, Principal Mary Gail Stablein retired after serving as Elsie Allen High School's principal for 16 years. Stablein focused on preparing students for careers and higher education, boosting on campus the number of college-prep courses, student support services and job training and scholarship opportunities.

The founding principal was Carnell Edwards. He died in his home state of North Carolina in May 2011 of a heart attack.

References

External links

High schools in Santa Rosa, California
Educational institutions established in 1995
Public high schools in California
1995 establishments in California